Golf in Ireland dates to at least the mid-19th century, with the Royal Curragh Golf Club (the first golf club in Ireland) being founded in 1858. The two "oldest governing bodies in world golf", the Golfing Union of Ireland (GUI) and the Irish Ladies Golf Union (ILGU), were formed in 1891 and 1893 respectively. By 2008, the GUI had 166,419 members and the ILGU had 49,822 members, making them the third and seventh largest sports associations by membership base in Ireland. Operating as separate (men's and ladies') unions for over 120 years, the two entities formed a combined organisation, Golf Ireland, which ratified its first board in early 2021.

As of the 21st century, golf is among the most-played sports in the country, with a 2008 report for the Irish Sports Council indicating that golf was then the fourth most popular sport by participation rate. As of 2009, Ireland reportedly had the fourth most golf courses per capita in the world, and a 2012 Fáilte Ireland report stated that overseas visitors to the country spent €183m on golfing activities.

History of golf in Ireland

Early development

Golf in the modern world originated from a game played on the eastern coast of Scotland during the 15th century. The game later spread throughout the (then) British Empire, including to Ireland. While golf may have been played near Bray in County Wicklow during the 1760s, the game in Ireland largely developed during the mid-19th century, when a number of courses were built. One of the oldest and most popular at this time was the Royal Curragh Golf Club, which was founded in 1858.

Formation of amateur organisations
The Golfing Union of Ireland (GUI) was established in 1891, making it the oldest national golfing union in the world. Based at Carton House, Maynooth, as of 2018, it represented 430 golf clubs and 170,000 members.

The Irish Ladies' Golf Union (ILGU) was founded in 1893, just two years after the GUI, and is recognised as the "oldest Ladies Golf Union in the world". Based at Sandyford in Dublin, as of 2008 the ILGU had almost 50,000 members.

Following a consultation process which commenced in 2015, and after separate votes by representatives of both the GUI and ILGU, the two "oldest governing bodies in world golf" agreed to form a new joint governing organisation for golf in Ireland. The new combined body, "Golf Ireland", held its first general meeting (and ratified its first board and association president) in February 2021.

Professional and other organisations
The Professional Golfers' Association (Great Britain and Ireland) was founded in 1901 and is based out of The Belfry, England.  It was established to professionalise careers in golf and grow the golf community in Great Britain and Ireland.  The  Professional Golfers' Association (PGA) initially included 70 members, later growing to over 7,500.

The Confederation of Golf in Ireland is an umbrella body, formed by the GUI, ILGU and the PGA, to "help advance the sport of golf on the island of Ireland".

Tournaments
The Irish PGA Championship has been held annually at many of the nation's courses since its founding in 1907.  It is the oldest tournament in Ireland. The Irish Open is a professional tournament established in 1927.  It was revived in 1975 and is now on the European Tour and a qualifying event for the Open Championship. The Irish Amateur Open Championship is a 72-hole stroke play event established in 1892 by the Golfing Union of Ireland.  It has been held at the Royal Dublin Golf Club since 2007.  The Irish Senior Open is a 54-hole stroke play event in the European Seniors Tour.  It was established in 1997.  The Volopa Irish Challenge was established in 2015 and is a tournament on the Challenge Tour.

Past tournaments held in Ireland

Carroll's International
Celtic International
Challenge of Ireland
Greenore Professional Tournament
Irish Hospitals Tournament
Jeyes Tournament
Kerrygold International Classic
Ladies Irish Open
North West of Ireland Open
Portmarnock Professional Tournament
R.T.V. International Trophy

Notable courses

There are around 300 different courses on the island of Ireland. Around the entire coast of Ireland are links-style golf courses, played on sandy soils with firm conditions, often with views of the sea while inland there is a wide variety of parkland courses more usually containing trees and water hazards.

There are a number of historic courses in Ireland, whether that be tournament hosting history such as Portmarnock in the Dublin region, which was home to fifteen Irish Opens or Royal Portrush in County Antrim, the only course in Ireland to have held The Open Championship. A number of other clubs and courses were established in the 19th century such as the Royal Curragh Golf Club in Kildare (1858) and Lahinch Golf Club in County Clare (1894). Below is a list of some of the notable courses in Ireland;

Courses in Ireland

 Adare Manor Golf Club
 Ballybunion Golf Club (Old)
 Ballyliffin Golf Club (Glashedy)
 Ballyliffin Golf Club (Old)
 Belmullet Golf Club (Carne)
 Blainroe Golf Club
 County Louth Golf Club
 County Sligo Golf CLub (Championship)
 Cork Golf Club
 Donegal Golf Club
 Dooks Golf Club
 Druids Glen Golf Club
 Enniscrone Golf Club(Dunes)
 European Club
 Fota Island Golf Club (Deerpark)
 Headfort Golf Club (New)
 Island Golf Club
 K Club (Palmer)
 Killarney Golf and Fishing Club (Killeen)
 Killeen Castle Golf Club
 Lahinch Golf Club (Old)
 Mount Juliet Golf Course Conrad
 Old Head Golf Links
 Portmarnock Golf Club (Championship)
 Portsalon Golf Club
 Rosapenna Golf Club (Sandy Hills)
 Tralee Golf Club
 Trump International Golf Links, Doonbeg
 Waterville Golf Club

Notable golfers
Pádraig Harrington was the first golfer from Ireland to win The Open Championship. Shane Lowry won The Open Championship 2019 at Royal Portrush. Other notable Irish golfers include: Darren Clarke, Rory McIlroy, Graeme McDowell, Alexander William Shaw (founder of Lahinch and Limerick golf clubs), Rhona Adair (who contributed to the first American book on golfing for women entitled Golf for Women in 1904), Philomena Garvey (who won the British Ladies Amateur competition in 1957), and Paddy Skerritt (winner of the 1970 Alcan International).

Irish golfers

Rhona Adair (1878–1961)
Hugh Boyle (28 January 1936 – 23 May 2015)
Harry Bradshaw (9 October 1913 – December 1990)
Joe Carr (22 February 1922 – 3 June 2004)
 Richie Coughlan (born 7 April 1974)
Eamonn Darcy (born 7 August 1952)
Pat Doyle (10 March 1889 – 29 March 1971)
Paul Dunne (born 26 November 1992)
Philomena Garvey (26 April 1926 – 5 May 2009)
Stephen Grant (born 14 April 1977)
Pádraig Harrington (born 31 August 1971)
Mabel Harrison (1886 – 22 April 1972)
Florence Hezlet (c. 1884 – 2 November 1945)
David Higgins (born 1 December 1972)
Justin Kehoe (born 14 February 1980)
Jimmy Kinsella (born 25 May 1939)
Peter Lawrie (born 22 March 1974)
Shane Lowry (born 2 April 1987)
Leona Maguire (born 30 November 1994)
Lisa Maguire (born 30 November 1994)
Jimmy Martin (1924 – 14 February 2000)
Joe McDermott (born 17 September 1940)
Michael McGeady (born 11 May 1978)
Paul McGinley (born 16 December 1966)
Damien McGrane (born 13 April 1971)
Mark McNulty (born 25 October 1953)
Colm Moriarty (born 12 June 1979)
Gary Murphy (born 15 October 1972)
Keith Nolan (born 11 January 1973)
Christy O'Connor Jnr (19 August 1948 – 6 January 2016)
Christy O'Connor Snr (21 December 1924 – 14 May 2016)
John O'Leary (18 August 1949 – 26 March 2020)
Denis O'Sullivan (born 11 March 1948)
James Cecil Parke (26 July 1881 – 27 February 1946)
Kevin Phelan (born 8 November 1990)
Alexander William Shaw (27 October 1847 – 1923)
Paddy Skerritt (29 May 1926 – 21 November 2001)
Des Smyth (born 12 February 1953)
Simon Thornton (born 18 March 1977)
Philip Walton (born 28 March 1962)
Philip Wynne (c. 1873 – 17 January 1953)

See also
 Irish Women's Amateur Close Championship

References